L'arbitro (internationally released as Playing the Field, Football Crazy and The Referee) is a 1974 comedy film directed by Luigi Filippo D'Amico. The main character, Carmelo Lo Cascio, is inspired on the referee Concetto Lo Bello. The theme song, "Football Crazy", is sung by the football player Giorgio Chinaglia.

Cast 
Lando Buzzanca as Carmelo Lo Cascio 
Joan Collins as  Elena Sperani
Gabriella Pallotta  as Laura, wife of Lo Cascio
Ignazio Leone as  Fichera
Marisa Solinas as  Luisella, wife of Fichera 
Massimo Mollica as  La Forgia
Daniele Vargas as the president
 as himself
 as himself
Bruno Pizzul as  himself
Nicolò Carosio as himself
 as 
Gianfranco Barra as policeman in Terni
 as 
 as
Umberto D'Orsi as  the doctor
 as 
Renato Terra as 
 as 
 as
Carla Mancini as 
Alvaro Vitali as  the postman

See also    
 List of Italian films of 1974

References

External links

1974 films
Italian sports comedy films
Italian association football films
Films directed by Luigi Filippo D'Amico
1970s sports comedy films
Films scored by Guido & Maurizio De Angelis
1970s Italian-language films
Films with screenplays by Giulio Scarnicci
1970s Italian films
Films shot in Sicily
Films shot in Kenya